Allman Agard (1907 – 1 February 1981) was a Trinidadian cricketer. He played in eight first-class matches for Trinidad and Tobago from 1934 to 1938.

See also
 List of Trinidadian representative cricketers

References

External links
 

1907 births
1981 deaths
Trinidad and Tobago cricketers